Saara Inkeri Hyrkkö (born 26 August 1987 in Helsinki) is a Finnish politician currently serving in the Parliament of Finland for the Green League at the Uusimaa constituency.

References

1987 births
Living people
Finnish women engineers
Politicians from Helsinki
Green League politicians
Members of the Parliament of Finland (2019–23)
21st-century Finnish women politicians
Women members of the Parliament of Finland